This article refers to sports broadcasting rights in the Republic of Ireland. For a list of sports broadcasting rights in other countries, see List of sports television broadcast contracts.

Viewers in the Republic of Ireland can watch sports on Irish free-to-air channels RTÉ One, RTÉ Two, Virgin Media One, Virgin Media Two, Virgin Media Three, TG4, and on pay-TV networks such as Virgin Media Sport, Sky Sports, BT Sport, Premier Sports, FreeSports and Eurosport. They can also access Northern Ireland's version of British networks such as BBC One, BBC Two, ITV, Channel 4, Channel 5 and S4C on satellite and cable.

Gaelic Games

Gaelic Senior Hardball Singles: Spórt TG4 Highlights show
Gaelic Senior Softball Singles: Spórt TG4 Highlights show

Association football
FIFA World Cup
Finals tournament live on RTÉ until 2022, plus all Ireland qualifiers & UEFA Nations League Matches
2022 Qualifiers
UEFA
Virgin Media Sport (Selected European Qualifiers & Nations League (exclude the Republic of Ireland team) on Virgin Media Two, Virgin Media Three & Virgin Media More with highlights of all other matches (include the Republic of Ireland team))
AFC
Youtube
MyCujoo
CAF
Youtube
CONMEBOL
Premier Sports selected matches live
CONCACAF
LiveScore 70 matches live
FIFA Club World Cup: RTÉ: All matches live on RTÉ Player, with live coverage of semi-finals & final on TV for 2019 and 2020
FIFA Women's World Cup: RTÉ: 23 Matches live in English on RTÉ 2 and RTÉ, TG4: 29 matches live in Irish.
FIFA Boy's and Girl's Youth Championships (U-17 and U-20): RTÉ Sport and FreeSports until 2022.
UEFA European Football Championship: RTÉ: 30 of the games, TG4 to show 22 Matches
UEFA Nations League: Virgin Media & RTE Sport (selected matches (include both knock out matches (semi final and final) and exclude the Republic of Ireland team) with highlights of all other matches (include the Republic of Ireland team)) (All matches)) on RTE Sport live until 2024.
UEFA Euro qualifying: RTÉ: Republic of Ireland matches only, Virgin Media Sport (Selected matches (exclude the Republic of Ireland team) with highlights of all other matches (include the Republic of Ireland team)), and Premier Sports (All matches) until 2024
European Under-21 Championship: RTÉ: (selected matches live, plus highlights of all other matches) and Sky Sports (up to all 22 matches live) until 2021
European Under-19 Championship: RTÉ
European Women's Under-19 Championship: RTÉ
European Under-17 Championship: RTÉ: live in English and TG4 live in Irish.
European Women's Under-17 Championship: RTÉ: live in English and TG4 live in Irish.
Republic of Ireland Men's internationals: RTÉ: (qualifying games only) live until 2024.  (All Nations League, qualifying, and friendly games) live until 2022, and Virgin Media Sport (highlights of all fixtures) until 2022. RTÉ Radio 1 Live
Republic of Ireland Women's internationals: RTÉ
Republic of Ireland U21 internationals: 
Copa América: Premier Sports All 26 matches live in 2019
CONCACAF Gold Cup: FreeSports All 31 matches live in 2019
International Champions Cup: Premier Sports (15 matches live) and MUTV (MU matches only)
UEFA Champions League: RTÉ (1 Match on Tuesday Nights & Final), Virgin Media Sport (1 Games on Wednesday Night and highlights on Virgin Media Television; exclusive coverage of all other matches on Livescore App and BT Sport (other matches)  
UEFA Europa League: BT Sport (other matches) and Virgin Media Sport (2 Matches per round on Virgin Media Two with all other games on Virgin Media Sport channels), 2018–2021. 
UEFA Europa Conference League: BT Sport (other matches) and Virgin Media Sport (selected matches on Virgin Media Two with all other games on Virgin Media Sport channels), 2018–2021. 
UEFA Super Cup: Virgin Media Sport, BT Sport, RTÉ Radio 1 Live
UEFA Youth League: BT Sport, 2018–2021.
UEFA Women's Champions League: RTÉ & DAZN.
CONMEBOL Libertadores: LiveScore
CONMEBOL Sudamericana: LiveScore
CONMEBOL Recopa: LiveScore
CONCACAF Champions League: YouTube
CAF Women's Champions League: YouTube (full coverage)
CAF Super Cup: YouTube (as of 2021)
League of Ireland: RTÉ: Highlights and Matches Live
FAI Cup: RTÉ show 1 Second Round Match Live, 1 Third Round Match Live, 1 Quarter-Finals Match Live, 2 Semi-finals Matches Live, Final Live,
Premier League: Sky Sports (2019–22) 128 Live Matches, BT Sport (2019–22) 52 Live Matches, and Premier Sports (2019–22) 50 Live Matches (including Saturday 3pm games) BBC – Match of the Day Highlights.
FA Cup: BBC Sport & ITV Sport selected matches that aired and not aired live by BBC or ITV on Premier Sports
Scottish Professional Football League: Sky Sports
Scottish Cup: Viaplay Sports
Scottish League Cup: Viaplay Sports
Scottish Challenge Cup: BBC Alba
Irish Premiership: Live matches & Highlights on BBC NI & Sky Sports
County Antrim Shield: Final on BBC NI 
Irish Cup: Live matches on BBC NI 
Irish League Cup: Sky Sports Live & Highlights on BBC NI 
Vanarama National League: BT Sport
Serie A: Premier Sports, FreeSports, and LiveScore
Coppa Italia: BT Sport
Supercoppa Italiana: BT Sport
La Liga: Premier Sports (via LaLiga TV) and FreeSports
Segunda División: YouTube (regular season) and Premier Sports (play-offs, via LaLiga TV)
Danish Superliga: FreeSports one match per week live
Eliteserien: Eurosport
English Football League: Sky Sports, QUEST Highlights every weekend
FAI Junior Cup: Highlights, TG4 2014 and 2016 highlights
FAI Women's Cup: RTÉ Sport Live Final from the Aviva Stadium
FAI International Football Awards: RTÉ
Major League Soccer: Sky Sports (up to two matches per week) and FreeSports (most matches that not aired by Sky Sports) until 2022
Ligue 1: BT Sport until 2024
Trophée des Champions: BT Sport until 2024
Coupe de France: BT Sport (final only in 2019-20)
Coupe de la Ligue: BT Sport
Bundesliga: BT Sport until 2021
DFB-Pokal: YouTube (first round until quarter finals) and BT Sport (semi finals and a final)
Eredivisie: Premier Sports and LiveScore
Liga NOS: Premier Sports, FreeSports, and LiveScore
Taça de Portugal: FreeSports (final only)
Ekstraklasa (until 2020-21): FreeSports (two matches per week) and Ekstraklasa TV (all matches)
Russian Premier League: YouTube
A-League: BT Sport
Chinese Super League: Premier Sports, FreeSports, and LiveScore
J-League: FreeSports (four J1 matches per week until 2022) & YouTube (league cup and up to two J2 matches per week live, plus highlights of all three leagues and a league cup matches)
K-League: YouTube (one match per week live via COPA90)
FFA Cup: BT Sport

Futsal 

 FIFA Futsal World Cup: RTÉ Sport
 UEFA Futsal Championship: RTÉ Sport until 2022
 UEFA Futsal Champions League: BT Sport until 2021

Rugby Union

Golf
U.S. Masters: Sky Sports
U.S. Open (golf): Sky Sports
The Open: Sky Sports
Irish Open: RTÉ Sport & Sky Sports
Ryder Cup: Sky Sports
Pga Tour: Sky Sports
European Tour: Sky Sports

Boxing
Irish National Amateur Boxing Championships: Spórt TG4 since 2015, previously on RTÉ Sport
Frank Warren Promotions: Live on BT Sport
Matchroom Sport: Live on DAZN
PBC: Live on Box Nation and FITE TV
Cyclone Promotions: Live on Channel 5
European Amateur Boxing Championships: TG4
World Amateur Boxing Championships: RTÉ Sport 2009 & 2011, Spórt TG4 2013, RTÉ Sport 2015 - also on BoxNation
Dream Boxing: DAZN: October 2022 to October 2025, all fights

Kickboxing
King of Kings: DAZN: October 2022 to October 2025, all fights

Mixed Martial Arts

Tennis
Australian Open: Eurosport
US Open: Eurosport
Wimbledon:
French Open: 
ATP: Amazon Prime Video including Cup and Finals, through 2022
WTA: Amazon Prime Video including Finals, through 2023
Davis Cup: Eurosport All matches from finals, through 2020

Olympics
Summer Olympics: RTÉ Sport & Eurosport
Summer Paralympics: RTÉ Sport Live & Highlights
Commonwealth Games: Live on BBC in 2014 Commonwealth Games
Olympic Winter Games: Highlights RTÉ News Now 2014, never live on Irish television; Live on Eurosport 2018 & 2022, prev 1988-2010

Athletics
European Athletics Championships: RTÉ Sport  2018
European Athletics Indoor Championships: RTÉ Sport
IAAF World Championships: No current broadcaster. RTÉ Sport live 1983–1997, highlights 1999 & 2007. No World Championships covered since.
IAAF World Indoor Championships: No current broadcaster. 
Irish National Indoor Championships: RTÉ Sport
Irish National Track & Field Championships: RTÉ Sport
Irish Schools Track & Field Championships: No current broadcaster. 
Irish Schools Cross-Country Championships: No current broadcaster. 
World Cross Country Championships: RTÉ Sport Live up to 2002, returned to cover 2013 live only
European Cross Country Championships: RTÉ Sport Live
European Athletics Team Championships: No current broadcaster. Setanta Sports Live 2013 & 2015, Irish TV Live 2014
AIT Indoor International Grand Prix: TG4 
Antrim International Cross Country: 
Cork City Sports:TG4 live. 
Morton Games: No current broadcaster. 
Mary Peters International: No current broadcaster.
Rock'n'Roll Dublin Half-Marathon: No current broadcaster. 
 Women's Mini-Marathon: No current broadcaster.
Dublin Marathon: No current broadcaster. 
Great Ireland Run: RTÉ Sport Live 2002–2014, no longer on TV

Cricket
IPL Cricket: Sky Sports
Irish Cricket Team: BT Sport & Premier Sports
Cricket World Cup: Sky Sports

Horse Racing
Irish Grand National: RTÉ Sport
Galway Races: RTÉ Sport
Leopardstown Festival:RTÉ Sport
Punchestown: RTÉ Sport
Irish Derby: RTÉ Sport
Fairyhouse: RTÉ Sport
Cheltenham Festival: Virgin Media Sport
Epsom Derby: Virgin Media Sport
Aintree Hurdle: Virgin Media Sport
Aintree Grand National: Virgin Media Sport
Dubai World Cup: ITV Sport

Motor Sport

GP2: 
NASCAR: Premier Sports
Motorsport Ireland: Spórt TG4
World Rally Championship: BT Sport, Motors TV

Snooker

1:  with the exception of the Welsh Open which is broadcast free-to-air on BBC Wales.

Cycling
Tour de France: Spórt TG4
Vuelta a España: Spórt TG4
Rás Tailteann: RTÉ Sport
International Junior Tour of Ireland: TG4 highlights

Sailing
Volvo Ocean Race: TG4

Greyhound Racing
BoyleSports Irish Greyhound Derby 2016 Spórt TG4 
Racing from Curreheen Park and Limerick Greyhound Stadium: Spórt TG4

Hockey

Basketball

Australian Rules

Show Jumping

Notes

Ireland
Television in the Republic of Ireland